David Corner may refer to:

David Gregor Corner, German monk
David Corner (footballer), English professional footballer